At the 1962 British Empire and Commonwealth Games, the athletics events were held at Perry Lakes Stadium in Perth, Western Australia. The stadium, set in the suburb of Floreat, was purpose-built for the competition. A total of 31 events were contested, of which 21 by male and 10 by female athletes. The competition was affected by hot weather and soldiers from the Australian Army were called upon to supply athletes with water throughout the competition. Heavy wind also affected the programme, with the sprints and jumps most affected by the conditions.

The 1962 Games saw the reintroduction of the men's 3000 metres steeplechase and the women's 880 yards – events which had both been absent for four editions, having previously been held at the 1934 British Empire Games. Kenyan Seraphino Antao won double gold in the sprints, an achievement which marked a breakthrough in the sport for his country. Dorothy Hyman completed the same feat on the women's side. Peter Snell won gold medals in both the 880 yds and the mile run. In the men's 3 miles race, Ronald Clarke found himself outdone by reigning Olympics 5000 metres champion Murray Halberg. Women's thrower Valerie Young built upon her 1958 shot put gold with victories in both the shot put and discus throw.

Medal summary

Men

Women

Medal table

References

Results
Commonwealth Games Medallists - Men. GBR Athletics. Retrieved on 2010-08-28.
Commonwealth Games Medallists - Women. GBR Athletics. Retrieved on 2010-08-28.

 
1962
British Empire and Commonwealth Games
1962 British Empire Games